The Cornell Institute for Public Affairs (also known as CIPA) is a two-year, interdisciplinary Master of Public Administration (MPA) program at Cornell University. CIPA is part of the College of Human Ecology, Cornell University Graduate School and the Jeb E. Brooks School of Public Policy. CIPA MPA candidates are classified as Fellows.

History

Though an MPA degree has been offered at Cornell since 1946 (originally through the School of Business & Public Administration), the CIPA program was established as a stand-alone entity in 1985. CIPA currently has 14 core faculty and 104 field faculty members. The program has an average total enrollment of around 200 with roughly 60% of the students being international, representing as many as 30 to 35 different countries at any given time.  Currently, CIPA has 1,500 alumni.

Academics
CIPA Fellows design individualized plans of study based upon academic and professional interests and take courses from throughout the university.

CIPA Curriculum 

CIPA Fellows complete foundation courses in the following subject areas: Administrative, Political and Policy Processes, Economic Analysis and Public Finance, and Quantitative Analysis.
CIPA offers eight areas of concentration from which to choose and students take five courses in their chosen concentration:   
 Economic and Financial Policy
 Environmental Policy
 Government, Politics and Policy Studies
 Human Rights and Social Justice
 International Development Studies
 Public and Nonprofit Management
 Science, Technology and Infrastructure Policy
 Social Policy

Public Engagement 

Experiential learning is an integral component of the CIPA program. It serves as a practical complement to formal academic study. Students are expected to gain practical work experience in an area related to their concentration. There are several options for meeting this requirement. These can include an internship in the summer after their first year of study, off-campus study, or the Consulting for Government and Nonprofit Organizations course offered on-campus.

Professional Writing

As a culmination of the MPA program, students must demonstrate their high-level skills for writing and analysis by producing a professional writing project. There are three options for fulfilling this degree requirement: 
 Capstone Project
 Professional Report
 Thesis

Off-Campus study 

CIPA offers its MPA candidates numerous opportunities to  study off-campus. These include:
 CIPA Washington Externship Semester
 New York City Externship Semester
 Cornell in Rome Program
 SVYM Mysore, India Externship Semester
Fellows are limited to one off-campus study semester.

Rankings

For 2021, CIPA was ranked #34 overall out of 285 schools in the Best Public Affairs Programs category by U.S. News & World Report. In specialty areas, CIPA ranked #29 in Public Policy Analysis, #5 in Healthcare Policy and Management, and #12 in Social Policy.

Publications 
CIPA graduate students produce the online publication, The Cornell Policy Review, an academic journal focused on issues surrounding the field of public policy

Student life 
CIPA fosters a vibrant and active student community. Students come from around the globe and represent widely varied fields of interests, endeavors, and experiences.  CIPA has a long-standing reputation for fostering a culture of collaboration, openness, and genuine support and respect among students and faculty alike.  While pursuing their M.P.A., Fellows engage in a variety of co-curricular activities ranging from academic to purely social.

Co-curricular activities 
Official student-operated co-curricular activities at CIPA currently include:
 The Cornell Public Affairs Society (CPAS)
 The Cornell Policy Review
 Women in Public Policy (WIPP)
 Cornell Latin America Student Society (CLASS)
 Cornell International City/County Management Association (cICMA)

Campus

Though not associated with the Cornell University College of Agriculture and Life Sciences, the CIPA program is headquartered on the university's Ag Quad in Caldwell Hall. Caldwell is a historic building and the oldest on the Ag Quad. It is a Colonial Revival structure constructed in 1913.

References

External links
 

Public Affairs
Public administration schools in the United States
Public policy schools
Educational institutions established in 1985
1985 establishments in New York (state)